is a 2016 Japanese romantic comedy film directed by , written by Tomohiro Ōtoshi, starring Haruna Kawaguchi and Kento Hayashi and based on the webmanga series of the same name by . The film was announced on February 19, 2014. It was released in Japan on September 10, 2016.

Plot
Maki Eda (Haruna Kawaguchi) works for an advertising agency at a large company. She is single and doesn't have good luck with men. She also isn't very good at cooking and likes eating junk food. One day, she meets Nagisa Katayama (Kento Hayashi). He is an art teacher and a vegetarian. Unlike Maki, Nagisa cooks very well. The two people then happen to live together. Maki realizes that she is in love with Nagisa, but Nagisa is gay. Through his cooking, they solve their own problems and become important to each other.

Cast
Haruna Kawaguchi as Maki
Kento Hayashi as Nagisa
 as Arata Tachibana
Hiyori Sakurada as Minami Aoi
Mackenyu as Atsushi Babazono
 as Yassan

Mako Ishino

References

External links
 

Japanese romantic comedy films
2016 romantic comedy films
Live-action films based on manga
Films based on webcomics
2010s Japanese films
Japanese LGBT-related films
Gay-related films